Garra nasuta (nose logsucker) is a species of ray-finned fish in the genus Garra found in fast-flowing hill streams in Asia.

References 

Garra
Fish of Thailand
Fish described in 1838